Martin McNamara may refer to:

 Martin McNamara (Gaelic footballer) (born 1966), Irish Gaelic footballer
 Martin McNamara (hurler) (1864–?), Irish hurler
 Martin McNamara (politician) (1811–?), Irish-American politician 
 Martin Dewey McNamara (1896–1966), American Catholic bishop